McFarland High School is a public high school in McFarland, California, a city in Kern County north of Bakersfield and south of Fresno.

Academics
The school's API score was 701 in 2013.

Enrollment
In the 2013–14 school year, McFarland High School had an enrollment of 799 students, with, 0.5% Asian, 0.6% Filipino, 97.6% Hispanic, 0.5% Black, and 0.8% White.

Athletics
The school is notable for its succession of twenty-four CIF Central Section championships in cross country between 1987 and 2013.  The success of the team is documented in the 2015 Walt Disney Pictures film McFarland, USA starring Kevin Costner as James White, a cross country coach at McFarland.

See also

 McFarland, USA, a 2015 film set at the school

References

Public high schools in California
High schools in Kern County, California
1928 establishments in California